Richard Lovell Edgeworth (31 May 1744 – 13 June 1817) was an Anglo-Irish politician, writer and inventor.

Biography
Edgeworth was born in Pierrepont Street, Bath, England, son of Richard Edgeworth senior, and great-grandson of Sir Salathiel Lovell through his mother, Jane Lovell, granddaughter of Sir Salathiel. The Edgeworth family came to Ireland in the 1580s. Richard was descended from Francis Edgeworth, appointed joint Clerk of the Crown and Hanaper in 1606, who inherited a fortune from his brother Edward Edgeworth, Bishop of Down and Connor.

A Trinity College, Dublin and Corpus Christi College, Oxford alumnus, he is credited for creating, among other inventions, a machine to measure the size of a plot of land. He also made strides in developing educational methods. He anticipated the caterpillar track with an invention that he played around with for forty years but that he never successfully developed. He described it as a "cart that carries its own road".

He was married four times, including both Honora Sneyd and Frances Beaufort, older sister of Francis Beaufort of the Royal Navy. The two men installed a semaphore line for Ireland. Richard Lovell Edgeworth was a member of the Lunar Society of Birmingham. The Lunar Society evolved through various degrees of organization over a period of years, but was only ever an informal group. No constitution, minutes, publications or membership lists survive from any period, and evidence of its existence and activities is found only in the correspondence and notes of those associated with it. Dates given for the society range from sometime before 1760 to it still operating as late as 1813. Fourteen individuals have been identified as having verifiably attended Lunar Society meetings regularly over a long period during its most productive time: these are Matthew Boulton, Erasmus Darwin, Thomas Day, Richard Lovell Edgeworth, Samuel Galton, Jr., James Keir, Joseph Priestley, William Small, Jonathan Stokes, James Watt, Josiah Wedgwood, John Whitehurst and William Withering.

Richard Edgeworth and his family lived in Ireland at his estate at Edgeworthstown, County Longford, where he reclaimed bogs and improved roads.  He sat in Grattan's Parliament for St Johnstown (County Longford) from 1798 until the Act of Union in 1801, and advocated Catholic Emancipation and parliamentary reform. He was a founder-member of the Royal Irish Academy. He died in Edgeworthstown on 13 June 1817.

Family
He was the father of 22 children by his four wives

 Anna Maria Elers (1743–1773), of whom five children
 Richard Edgeworth (1765–1796), m. Elizabeth Knight 1788. Died in America
 Lovell Edgeworth (1766–1766)
 Maria Edgeworth (1768–1849) the novelist
 Emmeline Edgeworth (1770–1817), married Dr. John King of Bristol, October 1802
 Anna Maria Edgeworth (1773–1824), married Dr. Thomas Beddoes 1794.
 Honora Sneyd (1751 – 1 May 1780), of whom two children
 Honora Edgeworth (1774–1790) 
 Lovell Edgeworth (1775–1842), who inherited the property
  Elizabeth Sneyd (1753–1797), sister of Honora Sneyd, of whom five sons and four daughters
 Elizabeth Edgeworth (1781–1805)
 Henry Edgeworth (1782–1813)
 Charlotte Edgeworth (1783–1807)
 Sophia Edgeworth (1784–1784)
 Charles Sneyd Edgeworth (1786–1864) m. Henrica Broadhurst 1813, succeeded his brother Lovell Edgeworth
 William Edgeworth (1788–1790)
 Thomas Day Edgeworth (1789–1792)
 Honora Edgeworth (1792–1858), married Francis Beaufort (his brother-in-law from his fourth marriage) in 1838 
 William Edgeworth (1794–1829), engineer.
 Frances Ann Beaufort (1769–1865), botanical artist, daughter of Daniel Augustus Beaufort and Mary Waller, of whom six children
 Frances Maria Edgeworth (1799–1848) m. Lestock Wilson 1829
 Harriet Edgeworth (1801–1889) m. Richard Butler 1826
 Sophia Edgeworth (1803–1836) m. Barry Fox 1824
 Lucy Jane (1805–1897), married the Irish astronomer Thomas Romney Robinson 1843.
 Francis Beaufort Edgeworth (1809–1846), Mentioned in Thomas Carlyle's Life of Sterling. Married Rosa Florentina Eroles of Spain.
 Michael Pakenham Edgeworth (1812–1881), m. Christina Macpherson 1846, botanist.

References

Bibliography

External links
 
 
 
 
 
 The four wives of Richard Edgeworth Portraits
 The Edgeworth Family, National Portrait Gallery

1744 births
1817 deaths
People from Bath, Somerset
People from Lichfield
Alumni of Trinity College Dublin
English inventors
English non-fiction writers
Irish MPs 1798–1800
Members of the Parliament of Ireland (pre-1801) for County Longford constituencies
Members of the Royal Irish Academy
Fellows of the Royal Society
English male non-fiction writers